The 2022–23 Hofstra Pride men's basketball team represents Hofstra University in the 2022–23 NCAA Division I men's basketball season. The Pride, led by second-year head coach Speedy Claxton, play their home games at the Mack Sports Complex in Hempstead, New York as members of the Colonial Athletic Association.

Previous season
The Pride finished the 2021–22 season 21–11, 13–5 in CAA play to finish in third place. In the CAA tournament, they were upset by No. 6 seed Charleston in the quarterfinals.

Roster

Schedule and results

|-
!colspan=12 style=| Non-conference regular season

|-
!colspan=12 style=| CAA regular season

|-
!colspan=9 style=| CAA tournament

|-
!colspan=12 style=| NIT

Sources

References

Hofstra Pride men's basketball seasons
Hofstra
Hofstra Pride men's basketball
Hofstra Pride men's basketball
Hofstra